Savyasachi is a 2018 Indian Telugu-language psychological action thriller film written and directed by Chandoo Mondeti. The film features Naga Chaitanya, R. Madhavan (in his Telugu debut), Niddhi Agerwal and Bhumika Chawla. It was produced by Naveen Yerneni, C.V. Mohan, and Y. Ravi Shankar under the banner of Mythri Movie Makers. Savyasachi was made with a budget of 24 crore as per Mythri Movie Makers.

Plot 
A bus meets with an accident with 21 passengers. Vikram, was the only one that survived the accident. Vikram has vanishing twin syndrome, which makes Aditya, Vikram's invisible twin brother, control his left hand.

A few days after the accident, Vikram is shown to be an advertisement director with his assistant Kittu. The latter gets a client named Chitra. He reveals that Chitra was his love when they were in college. He makes an ad that shows everything from the 80s to the 90s. The ad becomes a hit, and an ad company asks Vikram to take the ad in America. The latter takes the shot in America with Kittu as the director. Vikram then reconciles with Chitra.

When Vikram comes back from America, he learns that his house exploded because of a bombed gas cylinder. He learns that his brother-in-law and his beloved niece Maha, died from that accident. Vikram gets overwhelmingly devastated but then learns that Maha is still alive and tries to find her. He learns that someone kidnapped Maha. With anger, Aditya kills all the men sent by the kidnapper and swears to find him. He tries to get help from a police officer, but gets nothing.

When he goes to a DNA doctor, he learns that the same day when he admits his pregnant wife to the hospital, the kidnapper sounded like a villager and kidnaps his wife. In order to save his wife, he signs the file in his hand. The next day, Vikram gets a death certificate of the DNA doctor. In order to find out who the kidnapper is, the kidnapper makes Vikram run to all the destinations while he chants devotional chants. While he was running, Vikram drinks water from a local train but later learns that the bottle was sedated, and he starts to sleep. When he is close to finding who the kidnapper is, he falls asleep. Chitra picks him up later on.

Vikram still recalls all the destinations he ran to and then learns that his name starts with A. To find out his connection with him, he searches for everything but learns that the chants he was chanting were marriage chants. He learns that he is Arun Raj Varma, his sister's almost-married husband. Vikram goes to his father to learn why he is like that. He learned that he had a bad life before and not marrying Siri, his sister, made him hungry for vengeance. Vikram investigates the places were he saw the unconscious boy, and the back window was full of dust. He dusts the window and sees the number 21.

Vikram then gets beaten up by a gang sent by Arun, but Aditya saves him. He goes to Arun's hideout, and Vikram and Arun engaged in fight, where Vikram sees Maha is in danger, she was going to fall on machine. Vikram tries to save her, but Arun hits him with statue. Vikram gets conscious and Aditya fractures Arun's hand and beats him and throws him on TV. Vikram catches falling Maha, and saves her from falling. Arun, still injured throws anchor on Vikram, but Aditya catches and throw back that anchor on Arun, killing him. Before dying, Vikram tells him that the person who creates change is good person, but person who destroys humanity is an evil.

In the end, Vikram praises Aditya for saving him, but then Aditya touches a stranger, and Vikram apologizes. He pleads Chitra to tell her about the syndrome, but she gets mad at him and leaves him. Vikram then gets mad at Aditya.

Cast 

 Naga Chaitanya as Vikram / Aditya
 R. Madhavan as Arun Raj Varma (Voice dubbed by Hemachandra)
 Niddhi Agerwal as Chitra 
 Bhumika Chawla as Siri, Vikram and Aditya's sister
 Kausalya as Mahalakshmi, Vikram, Aditya, and Siri's mother
 Bharath Reddy as Siri's husband
 Vennela Kishore as Kittu
 Dishita Sehgal as Maha/Mahalakshmi, Siri's daughter
 Rao Ramesh as Dr. Rajan
 Thagubothu Ramesh as Nanda Kishore
 Vidyullekha Raman as Tulasi Prasad
 Nagineedu as Arun's father
 Brahmaji as Police Chief 
 Viva Harsha as Harsha
 Shakalaka Shankar as Sathi Babu Lavangam
 Satya as Tenali
 Hyper Aadi as Padmanabham
 Rajitha as Shanti
 Eesha Rebba as stranger, in a cameo appearance

Production and release 
Savyasachi entered its final stage of filming in July 2018. Post-production was wrapped up in September 2018. The film was originally planned to release in March 2018, but it was postponed to June 2018 and was further delayed to November 2018.

Soundtrack 
The music was composed by M. M. Keeravani and released by Lahari Music. The track "Ninnu Road Meedha" is a remix of Nagarjuna's classic hit song "Ninnu Road Meeda" from the film Allari Alludu (1993).

Reception

Box office 
Savyasachi collected a share of 3.29 Crores on opening day in Telugu speaking states.
In 2 days, movie collected a total gross of 11.70 Crores and share of 6.30 Crores worldwide.
In its first weekend movie collected a total gross of 16 Crores and share of 8.50 Crores worldwide.

Critical reception 
Firstpost gave 2.5 out of 5 stars stating "The frustrating part about Savyasachi is watching how little it achieves despite having an interesting premise. It could have been cracker of a film, but it isn't quite so. The left hand packs a punch, but the narrative doesn't".
IndiaGlitz gave 2.75 out of 5 stars stating "'Savyasachi' is a routine drama involving a gutsy hero and an evil genius. It should have come with a fast pace.  Some emotions work here and there".
The Times of India gave 2.5 out of 5 stars stating "Watch this one if you're a Naga Chaitanya or Madhavan fan, but definitely leave your brains at home for this one".
India Today gave 2 out of 5 stars stating "Director Chandoo Mondeti's Savyasachi could have been an intriguing thriller, but it is not. Weak writing and underwhelming characterisations spoil the film".

Accolades
South Indian International Movie Awards
 Nominated - Best Debut Actress - Nidhhi Agerwal
 Nominated - Best Actor in a Negative Role - R. Madhavan
 Nominated - Best Female Playback Singer - Shreya Gopuraju for "Tik Tik Tik"

Radio City Cine Awards Telugu
 Nominated - Best villain - R. Madhavan

66th Filmfare Awards South
 Nominated - Best Supporting Actor - R. Madhavan

References

External links 
 

2018 films
Films shot in Jammu and Kashmir
Films shot in New York City
Films shot in Hyderabad, India
Indian psychological thriller films
Indian action thriller films
Films scored by M. M. Keeravani
2010s Telugu-language films
2018 action films
Mythri Movie Makers films